The Spanish Fort Site (22-SH-500) is an archaeological site in the Delta region of the U.S. state of Mississippi.  It is one of three major earthwork sites in the far southern portion of the Yazoo River valley, and it has been designated a historic site because of its archaeological value.  Despite its name, the site was not built by the Spanish, and its original purpose is believed to have been ceremonial, not martial.

Location and excavations
Along with the nearby Leist A and Little Spanish Fort sites, it is a semicircular earthwork that has received little archaeological attention. In 1988, the site was classified as having been built by peoples of the Anderson Landing phase, but this assignment was largely due to the presence of an Anderson Landing site near the earthworks. The site first appeared in print in the early twentieth century in the account of archaeologist Clarence Bloomfield Moore, who sank a few test pits at the site; according to his report, the site comprised an embankment and a group of mounds. From 1949 to 1955, yet another expedition collected artifacts from the surface and conducted more test excavations; they found evidence of occupation by the Marksville (Issaquena phase), Coles Creek (Aden phase), and Baytown (Deasonville phase) cultures.

Conclusions
Excavations at Little Spanish Fort led an archaeologist working with the Forest Service to conclude in 1993 that the three sites could not be assigned a single conclusive date, due to the presence of cultural material as old as the Archaic period and as recent as the Mississippian period.  However, the study suggested that the enclosure itself was constructed during the early portion of the Middle Woodland period; the site has yielded pottery with characteristics that appear to have been created as local peoples' culture was changing from Tchefuncte to Marksville.  Radiocarbon dating shows that the Little Spanish Fort, which also was built during the Marksville period, was constructed approximately 2110 BP (160 BC) — despite their names, the earthwork sites were built long before the first Spanish presence in the region.  Archaeologists have disputed the reasons for building the Spanish Fort and the other nearby earthworks: some hold that their circular or semicircular shape represented a method for humans to contain the vast cosmos, while others argue that the process of construction was their builders' method of joining in the cosmos.  Scholars are agreed that the Spanish Fort Site and similar sites were ceremonial locations, rather than fortifications.

Preservation
Spanish Fort is one of five Sharkey County sites on the National Register, along with Leist A, the Rolling Fork Mounds, the Savory Site, and the Cary Site. The Little Spanish Fort is not listed on the National Register.

References

Further reading
 Moore, Clarence B.  "Certain Mounds of Arkansas and Mississippi".  Journal of the Academy of Natural Sciences of Philadelphia 13 (1908): 480-605.

Mounds in Mississippi
Baytown culture
Archaeological sites of the Coles Creek culture
Geography of Sharkey County, Mississippi
Marksville culture
Archaeological sites on the National Register of Historic Places in Mississippi
National Register of Historic Places in Sharkey County, Mississippi
Middle Woodland period